Umezawa (written:  or ) is a Japanese surname. Notable people with the surname include:

, Japanese scientist
, Japanese manga artist
, Japanese physicist
, Japanese fencer
, Japanese footballer
, Japanese footballer
, Japanese samurai and general
, Japanese sprint canoeist
, Japanese Go player

Japanese-language surnames